Ducun is a town located in Suzhou, China. A village was established during the early Ming, and during the Qing Dynasty the town was founded. It covers an area of  29.7 square kilometres and has a population of around 250,000.

Ducun is famous for the export of knitted goods, particularly sweaters. There are more than 100 factories in Ducun producing these for export.

References

Township-level divisions of Jiangsu